Shuanghuanglian (Chinese:  双黄连) is a traditional Chinese medicine with a long history for treating respiratory tract infection in China. Some of its active ingredients are Wogonin, Baicalin and baicalein. It is derived from three Chinese herbal medicines, namely, Lonicera japonica Thunb., Scutellaria baicalensis Georgi, and Forsythia suspense (Thunb.) Vahl. It has been used for the treatment of acute respiratory tract infections since 1973. It is mentioned in the Chinese Pharmacopoeia.

The substance has been shown in vitro to be cytotoxic "against a clinical isolate of SARS-CoV-2".

History
In July 2020, Su et al reported on an in vitro experiment of its effect on COVID-19. Following the release of the report, which was in part supported by the Jack Ma Foundation, there was an uptick in Shuanghuanglian sales.

References

Traditional Chinese medicine